Branimir Kostić (born 23 September 1988) is a Serbian football midfielder who plays for FK Jedinstvo Stara Pazova.

References

External links
 
 Branimir Kostić stats at utakmica.rs

1988 births
Living people
People from Inđija
Association football midfielders
Serbian footballers
FK Inđija players
FK Borac Čačak players
Serbian SuperLiga players
Serbian expatriate footballers
Serbian expatriate sportspeople in Switzerland
Expatriate footballers in Switzerland